Jerzy Marian Langer (born 18 July 1947, Łódź, Poland) is a Polish physicist specializing in condensed matter physics. He is a professor at the Institute of Physics of the Polish Academy of Sciences. Langer is currently an Ambassador for the European Innovation Council for the years 2021-2027.

Awards and honors
Langer became a fellow of the American Physical Society in 1989 "for contributions in the area of defects and recombination phenomena in semiconductors and ionic solids." He is also a fellow of the Warsaw Scientific Society, and Academia Europaea.

References

1947 births
Living people
20th-century Polish physicists
Fellows of the American Physical Society
Members of Academia Europaea
21st-century Polish physicists